Real Aguascalientes Fútbol Club was a Mexican football club that plays in the Tercera División de México. The club was based in Aguascalientes City, Aguascalientes and was founded in 2014.

See also
Football in Mexico
Tercera División de México

External links
Tercera Divicion

References 

Aguascalientes City
Football clubs in Aguascalientes
Association football clubs established in 2014
2014 establishments in Mexico